Intelsat III F-6 was a communications satellite owned by Intelsat. The satellite had an estimated useful life of 5 years.

Design 
The sixth of eight Intelsat III satellites to be launched, Intelsat III F-6 was built by TRW. It was a  spacecraft equipped with two transponders to be powered by body-mounted solar cells generating 183 watts of power. It had a design life of five years and carried an SVM-2 apogee motor for propulsion.

Launch 
Intelsat III F-6 was launched on a Delta M rocket, flying from Launch Complex 17A at the Cape Canaveral Air Force Station. The launch took place on January 15, 1970, with the spacecraft bound for a geosynchronous transfer orbit.

See also

 1970 in spaceflight

References

Intelsat satellites
Spacecraft launched in 1970
1970 in spaceflight
Satellite launch failures